The 2012–13 Chicago Blackhawks season was the 87th season for the National Hockey League (NHL) franchise that was established on September 25, 1926. The regular season was reduced from its usual 82 games to 48 due to a lockout. The Blackhawks captured the Western Conference championship and went on to defeat the Eastern Conference playoff champion Boston Bruins in six games to capture their fifth Stanley Cup in team history. The Blackhawks also became just the eighth team to win both the Cup and the Presidents' Trophy (as the team with the best regular season record) in the same season, as well as the first team to win multiple championships during the NHL’s salary cap era. Chicago's Patrick Kane was awarded the Conn Smythe Trophy as the Most Valuable Player of the playoffs.

Off-season
Sheldon Brookbank, and Michal Rozsival re-signed with the Chicago Blackhawks during the off-season. Sean O'Donnell, and Andrew Brunette retired. Rostislav Olesz, and Steve Montador both had a Compliance buyout. Blackhawks made a trade with the San Jose Sharks, as the Blackhawks got a 4th round 2012 draft pick, and a 7th round 2013 draft pick; in exchange the Sharks got a 4th round 2012 pick.

Pre-season
Due to the 2012–13 NHL lockout, the NHL pre-season was cancelled.

Regular season
The 48-game, shortened season was limited to conference and divisional games only. The Blackhawks did not play any teams from the Eastern Conference until they advanced to the 2013 Stanley Cup Finals against the Boston Bruins. The Blackhawks played three games each against non-divisional teams. Against their own division, the Blackhawks played four games against the Columbus Blue Jackets and Detroit Red Wings and five games against the Nashville Predators and St. Louis Blues.

On January 26 against the Columbus Blue Jackets, the Blackhawks tied a franchise record by starting the season 5–0–0 for the first time since the 1971–72 season. On the very next night, against the Detroit Red Wings, the Blackhawks set a new franchise record by starting the season 6–0–0. On February 19, against the Vancouver Canucks, the Blackhawks tied the NHL record set by the Anaheim Ducks in 2006–07 with a 16-game unbeaten streak to start the season, and beat the Ducks' record (28 points) by one point. On February 22 against the San Jose Sharks, the Blackhawks set a new NHL record with a 17 game unbeaten streak to start a season. On March 5 against the Minnesota Wild, the Blackhawks set a franchise record with a 10th consecutive win. The Blackhawks went on to extend both records for first consecutive games without a regulation loss (win or tie) to start a season and franchise record for most consecutive wins to 24 games (21–0–3) and 11 wins, respectively. On March 8 against the Colorado Avalanche, the Blackhawks' streak was snapped by a 6–2 loss.

On February 10 against the Nashville Predators, the Blackhawks recorded their first shutout since March 23, 2011, ending its shutout drought after 690 days. The Blackhawks proceeded to record seven shutouts during the season, tied for first in the league with the St. Louis Blues and Vancouver Canucks. On March 6 against the Colorado Avalanche, Ray Emery became the first goaltender in NHL history to start a season with 10 straight wins. Emery was also the first goaltender in franchise history to record 10 consecutive wins at any point in a season, overriding Glenn Hall's streak of nine straight from 1966–67. Emery extended both the NHL- and franchise-record to 12 wins (12–0–0) to start the season. The goaltending duo of Corey Crawford and Emery went on to capture the William M. Jennings Trophy for allowing an NHL-low 102 goals during the season. This was the franchise's fourth Jennings Trophy, with the previous three all captured by goaltending tandems featuring Ed Belfour.

As a result of the streak, the Blackhawks hold the second longest NHL record for most consecutive games earning a point at 30 games (24–0–6), a streak spanning two seasons, starting from March 27, 2012, of the 2011–12 season. The record stands behind the 1979–80 Philadelphia Flyers, which recorded a 35 consecutive game point streak of 25–0–10, all in a single season. The Blackhawks' streak also ranks third for most consecutive games point in a single season at 24 games (21–0–3), behind the 1977–78 Montreal Canadiens at 28 games (23–0–5).

On March 26 against the Calgary Flames, Head Coach Joel Quenneville received his 649th regular season coaching win, surpassing the previous record held by Ron Wilson. Quenneville finished the season with 660 regular season coaching wins, and is ranked sixth among coaches with the most regular season coaching wins, first among active coaches.

On April 7, with a 5–3 win against the Nashville Predators, the Blackhawks became the first team to clinch a playoff berth in the 2013 Stanley Cup playoffs, guaranteeing a seventh seed finish in the Western Conference. On April 12, with a 3–2 shootout win against the Detroit Red Wings, the Blackhawks won the Central Division and reserved a third seed finish in the Western Conference. On April 17, the Blackhawks clinched the number one seed of the Western Conference after the Anaheim Ducks lost to the Columbus Blue Jackets in overtime. On April 24, the Blackhawks clinched the franchise's second Presidents' Trophy in a 4–1 win over the Edmonton Oilers. The win guaranteed the Blackhawks home-ice advantage throughout the playoffs.

The United Center also recorded its 200th consecutive combined regular season and playoff Blackhawks sell-out streak on March 1 against the Columbus Blue Jackets, which began during the 2007–08 season with the game on March 30, 2008, also against the Blue Jackets.

Legend:

Standings

Detailed records

Playoffs

The Blackhawks qualified for the playoff for the fifth consecutive season. As the Presidents' Trophy winner, the Blackhawks had home-ice advantage. They faced the eighth-seeded Minnesota Wild in the Western Conference Quarterfinals, beating the Wild 4–1 in the best-of-seven series matchup.

The Blackhawks advanced to the Western Conference Semifinals to meet the seventh-seeded Detroit Red Wings. This was the last time these two Original Six would face each other as Western Conference and Central Division opponents as the Red Wings would move to a different Division and Conference starting in the 2013–14 season. The Blackhawks won the series opener, but dropped three straight games. In Game 6, Blackhawks forward Michael Frolik was awarded a penalty shot by the officials. Frolik successfully converted against Red Wings goaltender Jimmy Howard, becoming the first player in NHL playoff history to score twice on a penalty shot. Frolik's last successful attempt on penalty shot was against the Vancouver Canucks during the first round of the 2010–11 playoffs.

The Blackhawks won Game 7 in overtime.

The Blackhawks advanced to the Western Conference Finals, making their third appearance in five seasons, where they faced the fifth seed and defending Stanley Cup champion, the Los Angeles Kings. The Blackhawks won the first two games of the series on home ice at the United Center. The Kings won Game 3, however, improving their playoff home win streak to 15–0 at the Staples Center. The Blackhawks rebounded in Game 4, snapping the Kings' playoff home win streak before returning to the United Center for Game 5.

The Blackhawks eliminated the reigning Stanley Cup Champions in Game 5 in double-overtime. The game ended at 11:40 of the second overtime period with a goal by Blackhawks forward Patrick Kane. The game-winning goal was Kane's third of the game, his second NHL career playoff hat-trick.

The Blackhawks clinched their second Stanley Cup Finals berth in four seasons and faced the 2011 Stanley Cup champions, the Boston Bruins. This marked the first faceoff of the season between the two teams due to the lockout-induced shortened season and the resulting intra-Conference-only match-ups. This also marked the first time since 1979 (Montreal Canadiens and New York Rangers) that two Original Six teams met in the Stanley Cup Finals.

The Blackhawks won Game 1 at 12:08 of the third overtime period, which nearly equated to two regulation NHL games. Game 1 went in the history books as the longest NHL game ever played at the United Center as well as the fifth-longest game in Stanley Cup Finals history.

The Blackhawks lost the next two games, Game 2 in overtime, giving the Bruins the lead in the series.

The Blackhawks rebounded in Game 4, winning 6–5 in overtime, equalizing the series. Blackhawks defensemen Brent Seabrook scored the game-winning overtime goal in Game 4, his second in the playoff since Game 7 of the Western Conference Quarterfinals against the Red Wings.

The Blackhawks returned to the United Center for Game 5, winning 3–1 in regulation providing the Blackhawks a 3–2 lead in the series.

The Blackhawks returned to TD Garden for Game 6. Down 0–1 after 7:19 of play, Blackhawks captain Jonathan Toews equalized the game at 4:24 of the second period. Both teams were tied going into the third period, but a goal by Bruins forward Milan Lucic at 12:11 gave the Bruins the lead again. Desperate for the equalizing goal, the Blackhawks pulled goaltender Corey Crawford to add an extra attacker. Forward Bryan Bickell equalized the game with 1:16 remaining. Overtime seemed inevitable, again, but Blackhawks forward Dave Bolland scored the game-winning goal 17 seconds later to help the Blackhawks earn a 3–2 win in regulation, eliminate the Bruins and capture the Stanley Cup.

The win gave the Blackhawks their second Stanley Cup in four years, a first for any team since the salary cap era, and made them the first team since the 2008 Red Wings to clinch both the Presidents' Trophy and the Stanley Cup in the same year.

Patrick Kane was awarded the Conn Smythe Trophy as the playoff Most Valuable Player, becoming the first American-born forward and fourth American-born player to receive this award. Kane also became the third consecutive American-born player to receive the Conn Smythe after Tim Thomas and Jonathan Quick, both goaltenders, from the previous two years. The win also made Blackhawks' Head Coach Joel Quenneville the only active NHL coach with two Stanley Cups, while also adding a second consecutive Stanley Cup to Assistant Coach Jamie Kompon's resume after he clinched it the previous season with the Kings. This was also Blackhawks forward Marian Hossa's second Cup in four Stanley Cup Finals appearances, as well as Blackhawks' Senior Advisor of Hockey Operations Scotty Bowman's 13th appearance on the Stanley Cup.

Player statistics
Updated as of June 25, 2013

Skaters

Goaltenders

†Denotes player spent time with another team before joining the Blackhawks.  Stats reflect time with the Blackhawks only.
‡Traded mid-season
Bold/italics denotes franchise record

Awards and milestones

Awards

Milestones

Transactions
The Blackhawks have been involved in the following transactions during the 2012–13 season.

Trades

Free agents acquired

Free agents lost

Claimed via waivers

Lost via waivers

Player signings

Draft picks 
Chicago's picks at the 2012 NHL Entry Draft in Pittsburgh, Pennsylvania.

Draft notes
 The New York Rangers' fifth-round pick went to the Chicago Blackhawks as a result of a February 27, 2012, trade that sent John Scott to the Rangers in exchange for this pick.

See also 
 2012–13 NHL season

References

External links
2012–13 Chicago Blackhawks at Official Site
2012–13 Chicago Blackhawks at ESPN

Chicago Blackhawks seasons
Chicago Blackhawks season, 2012-13
Presidents' Trophy seasons
Western Conference (NHL) championship seasons
Stanley Cup championship seasons
Chicago
C
Chic
Chic